David H. Abbott is an American politician serving as a member of the Indiana House of Representatives from the 18th district. He assumed office on May 2, 2018.

Early life and education 
Abbott was born and raised in Fort Wayne, Indiana. After graduating from Elmhurst High School, he attended the Indiana University Bloomington.

Career 
Abbott served as a member of the Rome City Town Council for 27 years and the Noble County Board of Commissioners for three years. From 2007 to 2017, he was a design engineer at Luttman Precision Mold. Abbott was appointed to the Indiana House of Representatives in April 2018 and assumed office in May. Abbott also serves as vice chair of the House Natural Resources Committee.

References 

Living people
People from Fort Wayne, Indiana
Politicians from Fort Wayne, Indiana
People from Noble County, Indiana
Republican Party members of the Indiana House of Representatives
Year of birth missing (living people)